The Concordia Choir is a 68-member mixed choir of students at Concordia College, in Moorhead, Minnesota, United States. In addition to performing on campus regularly, the Concordia Choir has and continues to perform at locations around the world. Although international tours are only made once every 4 years, the choir travels around the U.S. for 2 weeks every year during its annual national tour in mid-late February. The choir has had three conductors since its founding in 1920, through which it grew under Paul J. Christiansen, who conducted it from 1937-1986. From 1986-2020, the choir was conducted by René Clausen, until he announced his retirement and Dr. Michael Culloton was announced as his successor. It has performed in venues including Carnegie Hall and the Kennedy Center. The Concordia Choir, in collaboration with The Concordia Orchestra as well as several other choirs on campus, performs in the annual (Emmy Award winning) Concordia College Christmas concert, which is occasionally broadcast on public radio and annually on PBS or other public stations throughout the United States. The choir has released recordings, which are sold by Concordia College.  Different genres are represented in the choir's discography. Critic David Vernier of Classics Today gave a perfect rating to the choir's album of 20th century masterpieces, In the New Moon, saying, "Choral music fans are in for a real treat--and those who choose to pass on this exemplary program and its rarely heard masterpieces will just have to be satisfied with their aesthetically diminished lives..."

External links
The Concordia Choir
Concordia College
René Clausen
Concordia Recordings

Notes

Choirs in Minnesota
University choirs
Musical groups established in 1920
Concordia College (Moorhead, Minnesota)